RMS Orizaba was a Royal Mail Ship wrecked off Rockingham, Western Australia on 16 February 1905. On her approach to Fremantle, a smog of bushfire smoke was obscuring the coast and the captain lost his bearings.

All 160 people on board were evacuated safely. It is one of the largest ships ever to be wrecked in Australian waters.

In 2014 the wreck was still in use as a dive site.

The ship was celebrated in music by Australian composer Auguste Wiegand, in his gavotte of the same name.

References

Further reading

External links 

 WA Heritage Council: "MANDURAH SHIPWRECK TRAIL", P. 2 (online-PDF 155 KB)

1886 ships
Ships built in Barrow-in-Furness
Maritime incidents in 1905
Ships sunk with no fatalities
Shipwrecks of Western Australia